The Firehorn is a mountain of the Bernese Alps, located north of Reckingen in the canton of Valais. It lies south of the Oberaarrothorn, between the Minstigergletscher and the Bächigletscher.

References

External links
 Firehorn on Hikr

Mountains of the Alps
Mountains of Valais
Alpine three-thousanders
Mountains of Switzerland